Rintu Roy is a List A cricketer from Bangladesh who played 4 matches for Sylhet Division in 2001/02.  His best bowling, 2 for 26, came against Barisal Division.

References

Bangladeshi cricketers
Sylhet Division cricketers
Living people
Year of birth missing (living people)